Chris Morrison or Christopher, Christine, or variation, may refer to:

Chris
 Chris Morrison, author of webcomic Polymer City Chronicles
 Chris Morrison, manager of the UK rock band Blur (band), Morcheeba
 Chris Morrison, lead guitarist of the U.S. pop band Allstar Weekend
 Chris Tuatara-Morrison (born 1986; patronymic name: Chris Morrison), Australian rugby footballer

Christine
 Christine Morrison Elementary School, School District 75 Mission, Fraser Valley, B.C., Canada
 Christine Morrison, who donated the SUNY Orange building Webb Horton House
 Sally Christine Morrison, who was honoured at the 2013 New Year Honours (New Zealand)

Christopher
 Christopher Wingfield Morrison aka Mink; British-American writer-director
 Christopher Morrison (athlete) of Jamaica, who won the silver medal at the 1998 Central American and Caribbean Junior Championships in Athletics
 Christopher Morrison (character), a fictional character from UK medical drama TV show Staying Alive (TV series)

See also

 Morrison (disambiguation)
 Chris (disambiguation)